Hunting Creek is a cove and tributary stream of the Potomac River between the City of Alexandria and Fairfax County in Virginia. It is formed by Cameron Run flowing from the west. The community of Huntington takes its name from the creek. Jones Point forms the north side.  Dyke Marsh is just to the south. The George Washington Memorial Parkway and Mount Vernon Trail cross it on a bridge.

The creek is sometimes referred to as "Great Hunting Creek", to distinguish it from Little Hunting Creek.

Notes

See also
List of rivers of Virginia

Rivers of Fairfax County, Virginia
Rivers of Virginia
Rivers of Alexandria, Virginia
Tributaries of the Potomac River